George Aubrey Lyward  (13 January 189422 June 1973) was a British educationist and psychotherapist who founded and led Finchden Manor, a "community for delinquent, disturbed or disturbing boys" in Tenterden, Kent, UK.

He was appointed an Officer of the Order of the British Empire (OBE) in 1970.

He featured in the BBC Radio 4 series Great Lives in May 2012, nominated by singer Tom Robinson. Robinson had attended Finchden Manor after a suicide attempt when aged 16, and said that Lyward saved his life.

Early life and education
Lyward grew up in the Clapham Junction area of south London.  His father was an opera singer but left home while Lyward was very young, and his mother worked as a primary school teacher.  He had three sisters. He won a scholarship to Emanuel School in Battersea, and there became a prefect, Head of House, and a sergeant in the Officers' Training Corps, and played rugby in the first XV despite a history of childhood polio which had left him with a weak leg.

After leaving school he taught in two prep schools and at Kingston Grammar School and then returned to Emanuel as a master, before winning in 1917 a choral scholarship to study at St John's College, Cambridge where he took a history degree.  In 1918 he obtained the post of house-tutor at The Perse School in Cambridge in order to supplement his modest choral scholarship funds.  In 1920 he started studying for ordination at Bishop's College, Cheshunt, but abandoned this two weeks before his planned ordination.

He taught again at Emanuel, then in 1923 moved to Trinity College, Glenalmond to work with the sixth form students, developing his ideas about teaching this age group.  In 1928 a broken engagement led to a breakdown and treatment by Hugh Crichton-Miller, who later asked Lyward to help with some of his own boy patients.  This work led directly to Lyward's work at Finchden Manor.

Lyward married Sarah (Sadie) whom he met in 1931, and she accompanied him to Finchden, but she died an early death at 54 from cancer in 1967.

Finchden Manor
Finchden Manor is a Grade II* listed building, described as "A large C16 timber-framed house with modern additions at the north west end", and having been used in the 19th century as a Benedictine priory.

Lyward opened a therapeutic community in a farm building at Guildables, Edenbridge, Kent in 1930, and by 1935 he moved it to larger premises at Finchden Manor. With the exception of WW2 years, when Finchden Manor was requisitioned by the army, he continued to work there until his death in 1973. During the war, Finchden continued at Marrington Hall, Chirbury, Shropshire.

Former residents of Finchden Manor include Tom Robinson, Alexis Korner, Francis Lickerish, Robert John Godfrey, Matthew Collings and Danny Kustow.

Robinson, writing in 2005, refers to Finchden Manor as "long closed", and the Friends Reunited entry says that it closed in 1974, within a year of Lyward's death.

Sydney Hopkins, author of Mister God, This Is Anna was referred to Finchden Manor and was later a member of staff there.

References

Further reading
 (abridged version available online)
 (Amazon.com record includes "Look inside" showing table of contents and first pages)

 Lyward, John (Pub.Lulu 2009). George Lyward: His Autobiography
Wendelken, Alan F. (Pub.Lulu 2019).  A Finchden Experience

External links
 "A site dedicated to George Aubrey Lyward 1894-1973", includes photographs, articles, and a BBC radio programme.
 Includes two photographs: the buildings, undated, and the community, early 1974.

1894 births
1973 deaths
People from Clapham
Alumni of St John's College, Cambridge
English educational theorists
Alumni of Bishops' College, Cheshunt